HMS L5 was a L-class submarine built for the Royal Navy during World War I. The boat survived the war and was sold for scrap in 1931.

Design and description
The L-class boats were enlarged and improved versions of the preceding E class. They displaced  on the surface and  submerged. The L-class submarines had a crew of 35 officers and ratings.

For surface running, the boats were powered by two 12-cylinder Vickers  diesel engines, each driving one propeller shaft. When submerged each propeller was driven by a  electric motor. They could reach  on the surface and  underwater.

The boats were armed with a total of six 18-inch (45 cm) torpedo tubes. Four of these were in the bow and the remaining pair in broadside mounts. They carried 10 reload torpedoes, all for the bow tubes. They were also armed with a  deck gun.

Construction and career
HMS L5 was laid down on 23 August 1916 by Swan Hunter at their Wallsend shipyard, launched on 1 September 1917, and completed on 15 May 1918. She was based at Falmouth, Cornwall in 1918. L5 was assigned to the 4th Submarine Flotilla and HMS Titania in 1919 and sailed to Hong Kong, arriving on 14 April 1920. She served on the China Station with other vessels of this class in the 1920s. On 20 October 1927 off Hong Kong, L5 and  rescued the crew of the merchant ship SS Irene from a pirate attack after firing her deck gun. HMS L5 was sold in 1931 and broken up in Charlestown, Fife.

Notes

References
 
 
 
 

 

British L-class submarines
Ships built on the River Tyne
1918 ships
World War I submarines of the United Kingdom
Royal Navy ship names
Ships built by Swan Hunter